The 2018 National League Central tie-breaker game was a one-game extension to Major League Baseball's (MLB) 2018 regular season, played between the Milwaukee Brewers and Chicago Cubs to determine the champion of the National League's (NL) Central Division. It was played at Wrigley Field in Chicago, Illinois on October 1, 2018.

The Brewers won, 3–1, and became the top seed in the NL playoffs. The Cubs hosted the NL West runner-up Colorado Rockies in the NL Wild Card Game on October 2, with the Rockies winning 2–1 in 13 innings to advance to face the Brewers in the National League Division Series.

The tie-breaker was counted as a regular season game for both teams, with all events in the game added to regular season statistics. October 1 also marked the first time two division tie-breakers had been played in a single season.

Background

Chicago had won two consecutive National League Central division championships, and were expected to win a third-consecutive Division title. The Milwaukee Brewers finished 2017 six games back of the Cubs, despite leading the 2017 division race by 5.5 games at the All-Star break. Milwaukee's last playoff appearance was its 2011 division title.

To challenge for the 2018 division, the Brewers made several key offseason acquisitions, among them starter Jhoulys Chacin, former Kansas City Royal Lorenzo Cain and then-Marlins outfielder Christian Yelich. The Cubs' high-profile offseason acquisitions, Yu Darvish and Brandon Morrow, were lost to injury during the season, and both missed the tie-breaker game.

Milwaukee emerged from a crowded early division race on May 18. Chicago took the division lead from the Brewers on July 14 and maintained sole possession of first place until falling to a third-place St. Louis club at home in the penultimate game of the season. Chicago had surged out of the All-Star break to a five-game lead over the Brewers lead on September 2, but Milwaukee put together a 19–7 September record that included four wins over the Cubs in nine days.

The Brewers ended the season on an 8-game win streak, while the Cubs won their final game 10–5 over the Cards to force the tiebreaker. The Cubs won the right to host the tie-breaker with an 11–8 head-to-head record against the Brewers.

Game summary

José Quintana started for Chicago, and Jhoulys Chacín started for Milwaukee. ESPN broadcast the game, with Karl Ravech, Eduardo Pérez, Tim Kurkjian, and Buster Olney. The game was also broadcast on ESPN Radio, with Jason Benetti and Chris Singleton.

Christian Yelich had a run batted in (RBI) single for the Brewers in the third inning. Anthony Rizzo of the Cubs tied the game with a home run in the fifth inning, the first hit the Cubs had off of Chacín. Lorenzo Cain and Ryan Braun of the Brewers added RBI singles in the eighth inning. Orlando Arcia had his first career four hit game and scored two of Milwaukee's runs.

Aftermath

With the win, the Brewers extended their regular-season win streak to 9 and qualified for home-field advantage throughout the NL playoffs. Finishing one loss behind the Brewers, the Cubs hosted the 2018 NL Wild Card Game and the NL West runner-up Rockies the following day. Colorado defeated the Cubs in 13 innings. It was Chicago's first opening-round exit since the Dodgers swept the Cubs in the 2008 NLDS.

Milwaukee swept the Rockies in the NLDS, but their win streak ended at 14 in the 2018 NLCS when the Dodgers beat Milwaukee 4–3 on October 13, the Brewers' first loss in 27 days. L.A. would win the NL pennant at Miller Park in seven games.

Yellich won the NL MVP over Baez, who finished in second. Both men won Silver Slugger awards and finished as Gold Glove runners up at their respective positions. Rizzo, Cain, Brewers third baseman Travis Shaw and Cubs right fielder Jason Heyward were also Gold Glove runners up. Brewers manager Craig Counsell would finish second in NL Manager of the Year voting, losing to Atlanta Braves manager Brian Snitker.

This game, along with the NL West tie-breaker game, were the last such tie-breaker games in Major League Baseball, as the league eliminated this scenario starting with the 2022 season. All ties in the standings would be broken through various formulas.

Footnotes

References

General

Specific

2010s in Chicago
National League Central tie-breaker game
National League Central tie-breaker game
Chicago Cubs
Major League Baseball tie-breaker games
Milwaukee Brewers
National League Central tie-breaker game